Rohit Kumar (born 1 April 1997) is an Indian professional footballer who plays as a midfielder for Bengaluru in the Indian Super League.

Career

Early career 
Born in Delhi, Kumar represented and captained Delhi in the B.C. Roy Trophy in 2013. He soon joined the academy of DSK Shivajians. He also played for the DSK Shivajians B side in local league matches.

DSK Shivajians 
In August 2016 it was announced that Kumar was called up to the DSK Shivajians senior side for the 2016 Durand Cup. He scored his first goal for the senior side nine minutes into his debut in the club's first match of the Durand Cup on 28 August 2016 against Sporting Goa. His goal was the first as DSK Shivajians won 2–1. He then scored a brace in the side's next match against Gangtok Himalayan as DSK Shivajians once again won 2–1. He then scored again in the very next match against Indian Navy. His 36th-minute goal was the equalizer for DSK Shivajians as they drew the match 3–3.

Kumar then made his professional debut for the club in the I-League on 14 January 2017 against East Bengal. He came on as an 87th-minute substitute for Gouramangi Singh as DSK Shivajians were defeated 2–1.

FC Pune City 
Rohit made his professional debut for FC Pune City in the Indian Super League on 22 November 2017 against Delhi Dynamos FC. The very next match against ATK on 26 November 2017 in Kolkata he scored his first ISL goal for the club, which resulted in FC Pune City winning the match 4-1. His second goal also came against ATK in the 77th minute at the home ground of FC Pune City at the Shree Shiv Chhatrapati Sports Complex.

Hyderabad FC
He was signed by Hyderabad FC in 2019. He played in 9 matches and scored a goal during his only season at the club.

Kerala Blasters FC
On 26 August 2020,  Kerala Blasters FC announced signing of Rohit from Hyderabad. He went on to play 11 matches for Kerala Blasters in the following season.

Bengaluru FC 
On 29 July 2021, Bengaluru FC announced the signing of Rohit on a two year contract.

International 
Kumar has represented the India under-19s.

Career statistics

Club

Honours

Bengaluru
 Durand Cup: 2022

References

External links 
 
 Rohit Kumar  at FC Pune City Player Profile
 
 DSK Shivajians Football Club Profile

1997 births
Living people
People from Delhi
Indian footballers
DSK Shivajians FC players
FC Pune City players
Association football midfielders
Footballers from Delhi
I-League players
Indian Super League players
India youth international footballers
Kerala Blasters FC players
Bengaluru FC players